The 1973 Montana State Bobcats football team was an American football team that represented Montana State University in the Big Sky Conference during the 1973 NCAA Division II football season. In their third season under head coach Sonny Holland, the Bobcats compiled a 7–4 record (5–1 against Big Sky opponents) and finished second in the Big Sky. 

The team played its home games in the newly-constructed, 10,000-seat Reno H. Sales Stadium in Bozeman, Montana.

Schedule

References

Montana State
Montana State Bobcats football seasons
Montana State Bobcats football